Guys and Balls (German: Männer wie wir, literally Men like us, UK title: Balls) is a 2004 sports comedy/romance film by German American director Sherry Hormann about a gay goalkeeper who assembles a gay-only soccer team to play against his ex-team, which fired him due to homophobia.

Plot
Ecki (Maximilian Brückner) lives with his parents who own a bakery in Boldrup, a (fictitious) small German town near Dortmund. Football, the German national pastime, is particularly popular in this heavily industrialized region and Ecki has been an avid and successful player in a local club FC Boldrup, since his childhood days.

In a decisive game, he fails to keep a ball at a penalty and the team fails to get the promotion to the district league. The team are devastated and get drunk at a party. Ecki is then evicted from the team, with his mistake being used to cover the real reason—the revelation that he is gay that comes about when he is observed by some of his teammates kissing another player Tobias on the mouth.

Ecki is defiant and immediately sets out to form his own team and beat his ex-teammates at their game. So he sets off for Dortmund to find members for his new team with the help of his sister Susanne, who is living there. From the fans of his favorite club Borussia Dortmund he finds confusion, but he gradually succeeds in others places, such as a kebab shop and the leather bar 'Steel Tube' to recruit more homosexual players for his team. Among the greatest hopes are the two Brazilians Ronaldo and Ronaldinho and the actually hidden heterosexual bookseller Klaus.

Meanwhile, he also manages to win the heart of dreamboy Sven (David Rott), who becomes his first boyfriend. Training of the team is done by Karl (Rolf Zacher), an ex-soccer player himself who quit the sport years ago after a stinging defeat.

When the big day of the game comes, the match starts out badly for Ecki's team, but ultimately they are able to triumph over his old teammates by allowing their homophobia to turn against themselves.

Cast

 Eileen Eilender as Susanne jung 1
 Leon Breitenborn as Ecki jung 1
 Dietmar Bär as Vater (Father)
 Saskia Vester as Mutter (Mother)
 Anna Koesling as Susanne jung 2
 Steven Wellmann as Ecki jung 2
 Melody Sitta as Cordula jung
 Jan Giffel as Udo jung
 Maximilian Brückner as Ecki
 Willi Thomczyk as Wirt, Ticket seller
 Jochen Stern as Rentner Rudi
 Judith Hoersch as Cordula (billed as Judith Delphine Hoersch)
 Carlo Ljubek as Udo
 Mirko Lang as Tobias
 Tobias van Dieken as Bernhard (billed as Tobias Vandieken)
 Simon Solberg as Frank
 Felix Vörtler as Udos Vater
 Lisa Maria Potthoff as Susanne
 Hans Löw as Klaus
 Nikolai Will as Kunde in der Bäckerei, Customer
 Rolf Zacher as Trainer Karl
 Mariele Millowitsch as Wirtin Elke
 Ute Maria Lerner as Pregnant lady (Schwangere Frau)
 Nicholas Bodeux as Ehemann
 David Rott as Sven
 Heppi Pohl as beer garden Guest 1
 Dirk Koch as beer garden Guest 2
 Andreas Schmidt as Jürgen
 Michael Kleiber as BVB Fan 1
 Hans-Joachim Bauer as BVB Fan 2
 Billey Demirtas as Ercin
 Markus John as Tom
 Christian Berkel as Rudolf
 Charly Hübner as Horst
 Jeanette Goetz as male nurse (Krankenschwester) 1
 Sunia-Shahana Ali as male nurse (Krankenschwester) 2
 Marcel Nievelstein as Jan
 Sascha Herzogenrath as transvestite
 Thomas Fischer as Gay Firefighter 1
 Heup	Henning Heup as Gay Firefighter 2
 Michael von Burg as Martin
 Edesson Batista De Jesus as Ronaldo
 Edilton Pereira Da Cruz as Ronaldino
 Judith Döker as Prostitute
 Sybille J. Schedwill as Jan's Mutter
 Mohammad-Ali Behboudi as Ercin's Vater
 Max Hopp as Steffen
 Helmut Schenkel as Harley rider (Harleyfahrer)
 Rolf Vogel as Harleyfahrer
 Klaus Schwen as Harleyfahrer
 Frank Krebs as Harleyfahrer
 Franz-Josef Neumann as Harleyfahrer
 Markus Kaiser as Harleyfahrer
 Dennis Schenkel as Harleyfahrer
 Wolfgang Jansen as Harleyfahrer
 Markus Meisinger as FC Boldrup Fan
 J. Geraldo Datovo as Samba-Truppe
 Heinrich Weitz as referee (Schiedsrichter) 1
 Willi Meuser as Schiedsrichter 2
 Oskar Bläser as Trainer Boldrup
 Frank Tepferd as footballer (Fußballspieler) FC Boldrup
 Stefan Nüsser as Fußballspieler FC Boldrup
 Heiko von der Bey as Fußballspieler FC Boldrup
 David Careno as Fußballspieler FC Boldrup
 Daniel Careno as Fußballspieler FC Boldrup
 Martin Watson as Fußballspieler FC Boldrup
 Christoph Paeßens as Fußballspieler FC Boldrup
 Oli Scheel as Fußballspieler FC Boldrup
 Lutz Herdener as Fußballspieler FC Boldrup
 Jan Platte as Fußballspieler FC Ruhrgold
 Willi Schaaf as Fußballspieler FC Ruhrgold
 Marc Gößlig as Fußballspieler FC Ruhrgold
 Daniel Edingloh as Fußballspieler FC Ruhrgold
 Sebastian Klein as Fußballspieler FC Ruhrgold
 Detlev Henke as Fußballspieler FC Ruhrgold
 Christoph Kanne as Fußballspieler FC Ruhrgold
 Miklas Melin as Fussballspieler FC Ruhrgold 8 (as Niklas Melin)
 Malte Kossleck as Fußballspieler FC Ruhrgold
 Christian Ernst as Fußballspieler FC Ruhrgold
 Eric Beta as Fußballspieler FC Ruhrgold

Reaction
Männer wie wir may be regarded as the first major German sports comedy. While this genre is far more established in the United States with movies such as Hardball (2001) or The Mighty Ducks (1992) in which an underdog team is posed to somehow find the spirit to win an important game against a far superior opponent, these kinds of movies are relatively rare in German cinema. It may therefore not be surprising that this particular movie was made by an American-born director.

Awards
 Audience Award of the Connecticut Gay & Lesbian Film Festival 2006 in the category Best Feature Film (3rd place)
 Audience Award of the Gay & Lesbian Film Festival 2005 in Philadelphia in the category Best Feature
 Audience Award of the Milano Festival Internazionale di Cinema Gaylesbico 2006 in the category Best Film
 Audience Award of Outfest 2005 in Los Angeles in the category Outstanding Narrative Feature
 Jury Award of the Lesbian & Gay Festival Brussels 2005 in the category Best Foreign Language Film
 Le Prix du public of the Gay & Lesbian Film Festival 2005 in Long Island in the category Meilleur Long Gay

Critical reception
 

Joshua Katzman of the Chicago Reader called the film "engaging" and "well-paced" with "a vibrantly funny script". Dennis Harvey of Variety states that the film is "by-the-numbers ensemble dramedy that hits every underdog and gay-fish-out-of-water cliche on the nose". Jeanette Catsoulis of The New York Times said the "script groans with double-entendres" and it contains "lots of cheerful nudity, loving threesomes and more synonyms for "gay"".

References

External links
 

2004 films
2000s German-language films
Films directed by Sherry Hormann
Films scored by Martin Todsharow
2004 romantic comedy films
German association football films
LGBT-related sports comedy films
LGBT-related coming-of-age films
2000s sports comedy films
Football mass media in Germany
German LGBT-related films
Films shot in Cologne
LGBT-related romantic comedy films
2004 LGBT-related films
2000s German films